Camutanga is a city located in the state of Pernambuco, Brazil. Located  at 120 km from Recife, capital of the state of Pernambuco. Has an estimated (IBGE 2020) population of 8,572 people and one of the strongest GDP per capita of Zona da mata Pernambucana.

Geography
 State - Pernambuco
 Region - Zona da mata Pernambucana
 Boundaries - Itambé and Paraiba state    (N);  Ferreiros   (S);  Timbaúba   (W); Itambé   (E)
 Area - 37.3 km2
 Elevation - 98 m
 Hydrography - Goiana River
 Vegetation - Caducifólia forest
 Climate - Hot tropical and humid
 Annual average temperature - 25.2 c
 Distance to Recife - 120 km

Economy
The main economic activities in Camutanga are based in  food and beverage industry, commerce and agribusiness, especially sugarcane, bananas; and livestock such as cattle.

Economic indicators

Economy by Sector
2006

Health indicators

References

Municipalities in Pernambuco